"Let's Jump the Broomstick" is a song written by Charles Robins and performed first by a black Nashville group, Alvin Gaines & The Themes, in 1959, then covered that year by Brenda Lee.  Her version reached No.12 in the United Kingdom in 1961.  The song was featured on her 1960 album, Brenda Lee.  The song is based on the popular custom and phrase jumping the broom.

The song was arranged by Owen Bradley.

Other versions
Sandy Denny released a version on her 1971 album, The North Star Grassman and the Ravens.
Coast to Coast released a version of the song as a single in the UK in 1981.  It reached No. 28 on the UK Singles Chart.

In media
The song was used for a lyp-synch contest on the October 4, 1963 episode of Ready Steady Go! (the first appearance of The Beatles - who had once been Brenda Lee's opening act on a UK tour), judged by Paul McCartney, who chose 13-year-old Melanie Coe as the winner; a few years later, after Coe ran off with a boyfriend,  her disappearance made the front page of the Daily Mirror, which would serve as McCartney's inspiration for "She's Leaving Home".

References

1959 songs
1959 singles
1981 singles
Brenda Lee songs
Sandy Denny songs
Decca Records singles
Polydor Records singles
Song recordings produced by Owen Bradley